This discography features albums by jazz trumpeter Lee Morgan, groups he was a member of, and albums by other artists to which he made a significant contribution.

Discography

As leader/co-leader

As a member 
Art Blakey and The Jazz Messengers
 1957 Theory of Art (RCA Victor, 1958)
 1958-59 Drums Around the Corner (Blue Note, 1999)
 1958 Moanin' (Blue Note, 1959)
 1958 1958 – Paris Olympia (Fontana, 1958)
 1958 Des Femmes Disparaissent (Fontana, 1959) – soundtrack
 1959 Les Liaisons dangereuses with Barney Wilen (Fontana, 1960) – soundtrack
 1959 Africaine (Blue Note, 1981)
 1959 Just Coolin (Blue Note, 2020)
 1959 At the Jazz Corner of the World (Blue Note, 1959)(2 LP)
 1959 Paris Jam Session (Fontana, 1961)
 1960 The Big Beat (Blue Note, 1960)
 1960 A Night in Tunisia (Blue Note, 1961)
 1960 Like Someone in Love (Blue Note, 1967)
 1960 Meet You at the Jazz Corner of the World (Blue Note, 1960)(2 LP)
 1961 A Day with Art Blakey 1961 Vol.1 & Vol.2 (Eastwind, 1984)
 1961 Art Blakey!!!!! Jazz Messengers!!!!! (Impulse!, 1961)
 1961 The Freedom Rider (Blue Note, 1964)
 1961 Roots & Herbs (Blue Note, 1970)
 1961 The Witch Doctor (Blue Note, 1969)
 1961 Tokyo 1961 The Complete Concerts (Solar, 2014)
 1963 Golden Boy (Colpix, 1963)
 1961-64 Pisces (Blue Note, 1979)
 1964 Indestructible (Blue Note, 1966)
 1964 'S Make It (Limelight, 1965)
 1965 Soul Finger (Limelight, 1965)
 1965-66 Hold On, I'm Coming (Limelight, 1966)

As sideman 

With Charles Earland
 Intensity (Prestige, 1972) – Lee Morgan's last recording
  Charles III (Prestige, 1973) – recorded in 1972-73
  Funk Fantastique (Prestige, 2004) – recorded in 1971-73

With Curtis Fuller
 Sliding Easy (United Artists, 1959)
 The Curtis Fuller Jazztet (Savoy, 1959)
 Images of Curtis Fuller (Savoy, 1960)

With Dizzy Gillespie
 Dizzy in Greece (Verve, 1957) – recorded in 1956-57
 Birks' Works (Verve, 1957)
 Dizzy Gillespie at Newport (Verve, 1957)

With Andrew Hill
 Grass Roots (Blue Note, 1968)
 Lift Every Voice (Blue Note, 1970) – recorded in 1969-70

With Clifford Jordan
 Cliff Jordan (Blue Note, 1957)
 Live in Baltimore (Fresh Sound, 2003) – recorded in 1968

With Jackie McLean
 Jacknife (Blue Note, 1975) – recorded in 1965-66
 Consequence (Blue Note, 1979) – recorded in 1965

With Hank Mobley
 1956: Hank Mobley Sextet (Blue Note, 1957)
 1956: The Jazz Message of Hank Mobley, Vol. 2 (Savoy, 1957)
 1958: Monday Night at Birdland (Roulette, 1958) also with Curtis Fuller and Billy Root
 1958: Another Monday Night at Birdland (Roulette, 1958) also with Curtis Fuller and Billy Root
 1963: No Room for Squares (Blue Note, 1964)
 1965: Dippin' (Blue Note, 1966)
 1965: A Caddy for Daddy (Blue Note, 1967)
 1966: A Slice of the Top (Blue Note, 1979)
 1963-66: Straight No Filter (Blue Note, 1985)
 1967: Third Season (Blue Note, 1980)

With Wayne Shorter
 Introducing Wayne Shorter (Vee Jay, 1960) – recorded in 1959
 Night Dreamer (Blue Note, 1964)

With Jimmy Smith
 Confirmation (Blue Note, 1979) – recorded in 1957
 House Party  (Blue Note, 1958) – recorded in 1957-58
 The Sermon! (Blue Note, 1959) – recorded in 1957-58

With Lonnie Smith
 Think!  (Blue Note, 1969) – recorded in 1968
 Turning Point (Blue Note, 1969)

With others
 Ahmed Abdul-Malik, East Meets West (RCA Victor, 1960) – recorded in 1959
 Tina Brooks, Minor Move (Blue Note, 1980) – recorded in 1958
 John Coltrane, Blue Train (Blue Note, 1958) – recorded in 1957
 Buddy DeFranco, Blues Bag (Vee Jay, 1965)
 Art Farmer, Brass Shout (United Artists, 1981) – recorded in 1959
 Benny Golson, Benny Golson and the Philadelphians (United Artists, 1958)
 Johnny Griffin, A Blowin' Session (Blue Note, 1957)
 Joe Henderson, Mode for Joe (Blue Note, 1966)
 Ernie Henry, Last Chorus (Riverside, 1958) – recorded in 1956-57
 Freddie Hubbard, The Night of the Cookers (Blue Note, 1965)(2 LP)
 Bobbi Humphrey, Flute In (Blue Note, 1971)
 Elvin Jones, The Prime Element (Blue Note, 1976)(2 LP) – recorded in 1969
 Philly Joe Jones, Drums Around the World (Riverside, 1959)
 Quincy Jones, The Great Wide World of Quincy Jones (Mercury, 1959)
 Wynton Kelly, Kelly Great (Vee Jay, 1959)
 Harold Mabern, Greasy Kid Stuff! (Prestige, 1970)
 Grachan Moncur III, Evolution (Blue Note, 1964) – recorded in 1963
 Stanley Turrentine, Mr. Natural (Blue Note, 1980) – recorded in 1964
 McCoy Tyner, Tender Moments (Blue Note, 1968) – recorded in 1967
 Jack Wilson, Easterly Winds (Blue Note, 1968) – recorded in 1967
 Reuben Wilson, Love Bug (Blue Note, 1969)
 Larry Young, Mother Ship (Blue Note, 1980) – recorded in 1969
 The Young Lions, The Young Lions (Vee Jay, 1961) – recorded in 1960

External Links
 

Jazz discographies
 Lee Morgan discography
Discographies of American artists